
ARMA International (formerly the Association of Records Managers and Administrators) is a not-for-profit (charitable) membership association for information professionals, primarily information management (including records management) and information governance, and related industry practitioners and vendors. The association provides educational opportunities and educational publications covering aspects of information management broadly.

Overview 
The Association was founded in 1955. In 1975, the Association of Records Executives and Administrators (AREA) and the American Records Management Association merged to form ARMA International. The headquarters for ARMA International is Overland Park, Kansas.

ARMA International has more than 6,000 members, in over 30 countries besides its U.S. base,  and more than 100 chapters. Its members include records managers, attorneys, information technology professionals, consultants, and archivists involved in various aspects of managing records and information assets.

ARMA International sponsors a conference and expo in the latter half of each year. Topics addressed in the 120+ educational sessions include advanced technology, creating information structure, ediscovery and information law, information management fundamentals, information project management, and reducing organizational information risk. The expo features exhibitors displaying records and information technologies, products, and services.

See also
 Generally Accepted Recordkeeping Principles

References

External links
 ARMA International official website 

Information science
Archivist associations
Professional associations based in the United States
Organizations established in 1955
1955 establishments in Kansas
History organizations based in the United States